Chamaizi is an ancient archaeological site in eastern Crete with the only known oval-shaped building of the Minoan period. Below this building is evidence of Early Minoan building foundations.

Archaeology
Chamaizi was first excavated in 1903 by Stephanos Xanthoudides, and again in 1971 by Costis Davaras.

The MMIA building centers around a cistern.  The cistern likely collected water from rainfall, as the hilltop on which the building is situated, Souvloto Mouri pointed hill, has no wells or springs.

Finds excavated from Chamaizi are at the Agios Nikolaos, Crete Museum and the Heraklion Archaeological Museum.

Gallery

References
 Myers, J.W., Myers, E.E. and Cadogan, G. "Chamaizi" The Aerial Atlas of Ancient Crete

External links
 http://www.minoancrete.com/chamaizi.htm

Minoan sites in Crete
Populated places in ancient Greece